Elsie MacLeod was an American film actress who worked in Hollywood in the 1910s and early 1920s. She was primarily known for her starring roles in short Edison comedies.

Biography 
According to contemporaneous reporters, Elsie began acting at the age of 5 before going to drama school and honing her craft. She then began performing in vaudeville. She signed with Edison around 1910 and began acting in the studio's short films.

Selected filmography 

 The Right Way (1921)
 The Gold Cure (1919)
 Opportunity (1918)
 Social Quicksands (1918)
 Madame Jealousy (1918)
 Aladdin's Other Lamp (1917)
 The Beautiful Lie (1917)
 Carmen (1915)
 The Hazards of Helen (1914)

References 

American film actresses